Renville may refer to:

Places
In the United States:
 Renville, Minnesota
 Renville County, Minnesota
 Renville County, North Dakota

People
Joseph Renville
Gabriel Renville

Other
 USS Renville (APA-227)